Jan-Erik Karlsson (born 3 October 1939) is a retired Swedish steeplechase runner. He competed at the 1966 European Athletics Championships and 1968 Summer Olympics, but failed to reach the finals.

References

1939 births
Living people
Swedish male steeplechase runners
Olympic athletes of Sweden
Athletes (track and field) at the 1968 Summer Olympics
Athletes from Gothenburg